Matrix extracellular phosphoglycoprotein (Osteoblast/osteocyte factor 45) is a protein that in humans is encoded by the MEPE gene. A conserved RGD motif is found in this protein, and this is potentially involved in integrin recognition.

References

Further reading

Extracellular matrix proteins